Kirengeshoma is a genus containing two species of plants in the hydrangea family. Both are clump-forming perennials native to Eastern Asia, with sycamore-like palmate leaves and nodding, waxy yellow flowers on slender stalks, growing in shady environments. They are grown as garden plants in temperate regions of the world.

Species

References

External links

 BBC Plant finder

Hydrangeaceae
Cornales genera